Trichoformosomyia is a genus of flies in the family Tachinidae.

Species
 Trichoformosomyia sauteri Baranov, 1934

References

Tachinidae
Arthropods of Asia